Arnett is both a surname and a given name. Notable people with the name include:

Surname:
Benjamin W. Arnett (1838–1906), African American educator, bishop, and elected official
Chuck Arnett (1928–1988), American dancer
Jeffrey Jensen Arnett (born 1957), American psychologist
Jon Arnett (1935–2021), American college and National Football League player
Peter Arnett (born 1934), New Zealand-American journalist
Ross H. Arnett Jr. (1919–1999), American entomologist
Ulysses N. Arnett, Democratic President of the West Virginia Senate from 1877 to 1879
Will Arnett (born 1970), Canadian actor
William Arnett (1939–2020), American writer and art collector
W. David Arnett (born 1940), American astrophysicist

Given name:

Arnett Ace Mumford (1898–1962), African-American collegiate football coach
Arnett Cobb (1918–1989), American jazz tenor saxophonist
Arnett Howard (born 1959), American jazz musician 
Arnett Moultrie (born 1990), National Basketball Association player
Arnett Nelson (1892–1959), American jazz musician

ru:Арнетт